Raeesah Begum bte Farid Khan (born 10 November 1993) is a Singaporean social activist and former politician. A former member of the opposition Workers' Party (WP), she was the Member of Parliament (MP) representing the Compassvale division of Sengkang GRC between 2020 and 2021. She resigned from the Workers' Party and Parliament on 30 November 2021 after making unsubstantiated allegations in Parliament on three occasions.

In 2020, Khan was elected to the Workers’ Party central executive committee as Deputy Treasurer and was also a town councilor as Vice-Chairwoman of the Sengkang Town Council until 2021.

Early life and career 
Raeesah was born in 1993 in Singapore, she is the daughter of ethnic Malay parents of mixed-race ancestry, a marine service businessman named Farid Khan bin Kaim Khan who is of mixed Indian-Pakistani descent and was one of the candidate for 2017 presidential election and his wife Naeemah Shaik bte Abu Bakar who is of Arab descent.  She has a younger brother, Yusuf Khan.

Raeesah studied economics and marketing at Murdoch University.

In 2016, she founded the Reyna Movement, an organisation that aims to empower marginalised women and children through up-skilling programs and community engagement. The Reyna Movement has worked with women's shelters, the homeless, at-risk children and low-income families in Singapore.

Raeesah first met Mahadhir Caffoor in 2017. They married on 14 July 2018. Together, they have a son and daughter.

Political career 

Raeesah became a member of the Workers' Party in 2018, having previously volunteered in the party's grassroots activities. On 30 June 2020, Raeesah was announced as one of the party's four members contesting the Sengkang Group Representation Constituency as part of the 2020 Singaporean general election, alongside Jamus Lim, He Ting Ru, and Louis Chua. She is also the youngest candidate of the party.

Prior to getting elected, two separate police reports were lodged against Raeesah for allegedly making two online comments, both relating to the discrimination of race and religion. WP later came out to support Raeesah; Raeesah also apologised and released a statement stating that her intention was "never to cause social divisions but to raise awareness on minority issues", adding that she also regretted making her "insensitive" comments. Netizens labelled the bringing up of her past comments as a political move, with hashtags such as "#IStandWithRaeesah" trending on Twitter.

Together with the Workers' Party team contesting in Sengkang GRC, she was subsequently elected with 52.12% of the votes, defeating the People's Action Party in an upset victory that secured a second group representation constituency for the Workers' Party. She was the youngest Member of Parliament in the 14th Parliament of Singapore. On 17 September 2020, the Singapore Police Force issued her with a warning over the posts.

Allegations against the police
On 3 August 2021, Raeesah made an allegation against the Singapore Police Force during a parliamentary debate on empowering women. She alleged that in 2018, a police officer had made inappropriate comments about a 25-year-old rape victim whom she had accompanied to make a police report, and gave recommendations to increase sensitivity in investigations. Home Affairs Minister of State Desmond Tan subsequently said that the allegations are serious and needed investigation. When asked for details, Raeesah declined, saying that she did not wish to retraumatise the victim, affirming that the anecdote was not an isolated case. She also agreed to file a parliamentary question if it was about questions related to the issue, adding that the speech was not to cast aspersions on the police and clarifying later that the police can be the solution. She also said she was unsuccessful in contacting the victim after the incident happened, adding that she would communicate directly with the Ministry of Home Affairs in the future if a similar situation occurred. 

On 4 October 2021, Law and Home Affairs Minister K. Shanmugam said the police had checked their records and found no cases that fit Raeesah's description, so he asked her to provide more details about the alleged mishandling of the case. In response, Raeesah reaffirmed her statement but, citing concerns about confidentiality, declined to reveal any further details, including the police station they went to. On 20 October 2021, the police said that an extensive search had not managed to identify the case in question, adding that Raeesah had also not responded to their requests to provide more details about the case.

On 1 November 2021, Raeesah admitted that she had lied on three occasions about the alleged incident in Parliament. She had not accompanied the victim to make a police report, and had heard about it from a support group for women who had been victims of sexual assault. She also did not have the victim's consent to share the incident in Parliament. In explaining why she had lied, Raeesah claimed that she had been sexually assaulted when she was 18 while studying abroad. In response, Leader of the House Indranee Rajah expressed sympathy towards Raeesah but raised an official complaint against her for breaching her parliamentary privilege and asked for the matter to be referred to the Committee of Privileges. As Indranee and Shanmugam recused themselves from the committee specifically for this case, Minister for Culture, Community and Youth Edwin Tong and Parliamentary Secretary for Communications and Information and Health Rahayu Mahzam were nominated to the committee by Speaker Tan Chuan-Jin. Later on, Senior Minister of State for Defence and Manpower Zaqy Mohamad was appointed to replace Minister for Social and Family Development Masagos Zulkifli, who recused himself too.

The following day, the Workers' Party approved the formation of a disciplinary panel separate from the Committee of Privileges to look into Raeesah's conduct, chaired by Pritam Singh, Sylvia Lim and Faisal Manap.

Resignation

On 30 November 2021, Raeesah submitted her resignation from the Workers' Party and Parliament following the probe over her admission of lying. Raeesah also posted on her social media accounts her letter of resignation addressed to Speaker of Parliament Tan Chuan-Jin. Despite the resignation, the Committee of Privileges announced it will continue its investigations.

Two days later, the Workers' Party Central Executive Committee said they knew about the lies the week after her speech, but they decided to let her set the record straight after knowing her circumstances, with Workers' Party Secretary-General Pritam Singh asking Raeesah to make her best efforts in contacting the victim or the individuals involved in that sexual assault case. The matter was supposed to have been clarified in Parliament in September, but a shingles episode made that unlikely. When Raeesah returned to Parliament in October, she repeated her assertions instead of clarifying. Furthermore, the Party leaders voted overwhelmingly to ask Raeesah to resign even before she did so, with expulsion if she did not resign. Instead, Raeesah informed Pritam she would resign, before the Central Executive Committee met on the matter. In addition, the MPs of Sengkang GRC will not step down for a by-election, with the responsibilities of Compassvale divided accordingly. Workers' Party Vice-Chairperson and Aljunied GRC MP Faisal Manap will also act as an advisor to the Sengkang MPs. Additional support will be given for the Sengkang team during house visits, which will resume in January. The Workers' Party will review how candidates are selected for elections as well as vetting of speeches, even as it is not deterred from fielding young and progressive candidates in future elections. Before the speech was made, Raeesah was told to substantiate the anecdote, which was eventually not heeded. Separately, on former Non-constituency Member of Parliament Daniel Goh's comments, the Party said it would look into them, given that cadres do not share opinions openly, to which Goh said he had every right as a citizen to comment.

Investigations by the Committee of Privileges
After investigations, on 10 February 2022, the Committee of Privileges recommended that Raeesah be fined S$35,000, with Pritam Singh and Muhamad Faisal bin Abdul Manap being referred to the Public Prosecutor for prosecution. A parliamentary debate was held on 15 February, with the recommendations accepted. Subsequently on 29 April, the case was referred to the Police so that they can interview further witnesses who are related to this case.

References

External links
 Raeesah Khan on Parliament of Singapore
 Workers' Party biography

1993 births
Living people
Workers' Party (Singapore) politicians
Singaporean people of Arab descent
Murdoch University alumni
People from Singapore
Singaporean people of Indian descent
Singaporean people of Malay descent
Singaporean people of Pakistani descent
Singaporean women in politics
Members of the Parliament of Singapore